United Nations Security Council Resolution 1658, adopted unanimously on February 14, 2006, after recalling resolutions 1542 (2004), 1576 (2004) and 1608 (2005) on the situation in Haiti, the Council extended the mandate of the United Nations Stabilisation Mission in Haiti (MINUSTAH) until August 15, 2006.

Resolution

Observations
In the preamble of the resolution, the Council commended the holding of general elections on February 7, 2006 and welcomed the progress made in the political process and the role of MINUSTAH. It awaited the inauguration of a new President and recognised that a new chapter in the international community's efforts in Haiti would begin with the installation of a new government.

Council members stressed that security, the rule of law, political reconciliation and development were essential to the stability of Haiti; several paragraphs of the resolution dealt with the role of MINUSTAH assisting Haiti in these respects, including reform and human rights, though the Haitian people themselves were responsible for achieving these aims. Furthermore, international institutions were urged to continue to provide donations previously pledged to Haiti.

Acts
Under Chapter VII of the United Nations Charter, the Council extended the mandate of MINUSTAH with the intention of further renewals.  The Secretary-General Kofi Annan was requested to report on a possible restructuring of the MINUSTAH peacekeeping operation to support reform after consultations with the new Haitian government.

See also
 2004 Haitian coup d'état
 List of United Nations Security Council Resolutions 1601 to 1700 (2005–2006)

References

External links
 
Text of the Resolution at undocs.org

 1658
 1658
2006 in Haiti
February 2006 events